3 Years, 5 Months and 2 Days in the Life Of... is the debut album by American hip hop group Arrested Development, released on March 24, 1992. The album's chart success was the beginning of the popularization of Southern hip hop. 3 Years, 5 Months and 2 Days in the Life Of... stood in stark contrast to the gangsta rap that ruled the hip hop charts in 1992 (such as Dr. Dre's The Chronic), in its focus on spirituality, peace and love. The album's title refers to the length of time it took Arrested Development to get a record contract.

The album is also included in Robert Dimery's book 1001 Albums You Must Hear Before You Die.

Critical reception 

3 Years, 5 Months and 2 Days in the Life Of... was released to widespread critical acclaim and was later voted as the best album of the year in The Village Voices Pazz & Jop critics' poll. Entertainment Weekly'''s James Bernard praised it as a "fresh-sounding debut album" and referred to Arrested Development as "the anti-gangsta" and "perhaps rap's most self-reflective act." Greg Kot of the Chicago Tribune wrote that the group "displays unusual worldliness, wisdom and awareness on its debut, immediately establishing itself as a major new voice in hip-hop", noting Speech's social themes and rejection of "macho boasting and gangster posing". In a negative assessment, Robert Christgau of The Village Voice assigned the album a "dud" rating and wrote that the album was "not horrible by any means" but "too often the beats shambled and the raps meandered", though he would later revise his rating to single out "Tennessee" as a "choice cut".

Retrospectively, Steve Huey of AllMusic wrote that the rise of gangsta rap abruptly put an end to what seemed to be a "shining new era in alternative rap" heralded by 3 Years and that the album, while not "quite as revolutionary as it first seemed", was nonetheless "a fine record that often crosses the line into excellence", further crediting it as "a major influence on a new breed of alternative Southern hip-hop, including Goodie Mob, Outkast, and Nappy Roots".The Wire named the album its record of the year, the first time the magazine had expanded its year-end critics' poll to include albums in non-jazz genres. The album was included in the book 1001 Albums You Must Hear Before You Die.

 Track listing 
 "Man's Final Frontier" – 2:38
 "Mama's Always on Stage" (Speech) – 3:25
 Samples "We're Ready" by Buddy Guy and Junior Wells on the album Hoodoo Man Blues''
 "Parents Are People" by Harry Belafonte and Marlo Thomas
 "People Everyday" (Speech) – 3:26
 Interpolates "Everyday People" by Sly & the Family Stone & samples "Tappan Zee" by Bob James
 "Blues Happy" – 0:46
 "Mr. Wendal" (Speech) – 4:06
 Samples "Sing a Simple Song" by Sly & the Family Stone
 "Children Play with Earth" – 2:38
 "Raining Revolution" (Speech) – 3:55
 "Fishin' 4 Religion" (Speech) – 4:06
 "Give a Man a Fish" (Headliner/Speech) – 4:22
 Samples "When It Comes Down to It" by Minnie Riperton
 "U" (Speech) – 4:59
 Samples "Mighty Quinn" by Ramsey Lewis
 "Eve of Reality" – 1:53
 "Natural" (Speech) – 4:18
 Samples "Sunshine" by Earth, Wind & Fire.
 "Dawn of the Dreads" (Speech) – 5:17
 "Tennessee" (Speech) – 4:32
 Samples "Alphabet St." by Prince 
 "Papa Was Too" by Joe Tex 
 "Funky Drummer" by James Brown 
"BNH" by The Brand New Heavies 
"Tough" by Kurtis Blow 
 "Washed Away" (Speech) – 6:22
 Samples "Thin Line Between Love and Hate" by The Persuaders.

Personnel 
 Arrested Development – arranger
 Baba Oje
 Brother Larry – guitar
 Montsho Eshe
 Dionne Farris – vocals
 Headliner
 Aerle Taree – stylist
 Tom Held – engineer
 Larry Jackson	 – saxophone
 Terrance Cinque Mason – vocals
 Rasa Don – drums 
 Sister Paulette – vocals
 Speech – producer, executive producer, mixing
 Alvin Speights – engineer
 Howie Weinberg – mastering
 Richard Wells – engineer
 Lindsey Williams – project director
 Jeffrey Henson Scales – photography
 Matt Still – assistant engineer
 Randall Martin – art direction

Charts

Certifications

References 

Arrested Development (group) albums
Chrysalis Records albums
1992 debut albums
Alternative hip hop albums by American artists
EMI Records albums